A religious sister (abbreviated Sr. or Sist.) in the Catholic Church is a woman who has taken public vows in a religious institute dedicated to apostolic works, as distinguished from a nun who lives a cloistered monastic life dedicated to prayer. Both nuns and sisters use the term "sister" as a form of address.

The HarperCollins Encyclopedia of Catholicism (1995) defines as "congregations of sisters institutes of women who profess the simple vows of poverty, chastity, and obedience, live a common life, and are engaged in ministering to the needs of society." As William Saunders writes: "When bound by simple vows, a woman is a sister, not a nun, and thereby called 'sister'. Nuns recite the Liturgy of the Hours or Divine Office in common [...] [and] live a contemplative, cloistered life in a monastery [...] behind the 'papal enclosure'. Nuns are permitted to leave the cloister only under special circumstances and with the proper permission."

History

Until the 16th century, religious orders in the Western world made vows that were perpetual and solemn. In 1521, Pope Leo X allowed tertiaries of religious orders to take simple vows and live a more active life dedicated to charitable works. This provision was rejected by Pope Pius V in 1566 and 1568. Early efforts by women such as Angela Merici, founder of the Ursulines (1535), and Jane Frances de Chantal, founder with Francis de Sales of the Visitation Sisters (1610), were halted as the cloister was imposed by Church authorities.

Into the 17th century, Church custom did not allow women to leave the cloister if they had taken religious vows. Female members of the mendicant orders (Dominican, Augustinian, Carmelite, and Poor Clares) continued to observe the same enclosed life as members of the monastic orders. The work of religious women was confined to what could be carried on within the walls of a monastery, either teaching boarding students within the cloister or nursing the sick in hospitals attached to the monastery.

Mary Ward was an early proponent of women with religious vows living an active life outside the cloister, based on the apostolic life of the Jesuits. There was to be no enclosure, no common recitation of the Liturgy of the Hours, and no religious habit. In 1609 she established a religious community at Saint-Omer and opened schools for girls. Her efforts led to the founding of the Institute of the Blessed Virgin Mary or Sisters of Loreto (IBVM). Her congregation was suppressed in 1630, but continued to exist in some countries in various forms.

Other women's congregations with simple vows continued to be founded, at times with the approval of local bishops. Vincent de Paul insisted that the Daughters of Charity of Saint Vincent de Paul, which he founded, would have no convent but the hospital, no chapel but the parish church, and no cloister but the streets. They renew their vows annually. The 19th century saw the proliferation of women's congregations engaged in education, religious instruction, and medical and social works, along with missionary work in Africa and Asia. After nearly three centuries, in 1900 Pope Leo XIII by his constitution Conditae a Christo gave his approval to these congregations with simple vows.

20th century 

The 1917 Code of Canon Law reserved the term "nun" (Latin: monialis) for women religious who took solemn vows or who, while being allowed in some places to take simple vows, belonged to institutes whose vows were normally solemn. They lived under cloister, "papal enclosure", and recited the Liturgy of the Hours in common. The Code used the word "sister" (Latin: soror) for members of institutes for women that it classified as "congregations"; and for "nuns" and "sisters" jointly it used the Latin word religiosae (women religious).

The bishops at Vatican II, in their document Perfectae Caritatis on the religious life, asked all religious to examine their charism as defined by their rule and founder, in light of the needs of the modern world. Some religious who had led a more contemplative life responded to modern needs of the apostolate outside the monastic walls. Throughout the post-Vatican II document Ecclesiae Sanctae (1967), Pope Paul VI used the word "nun" to refer to women with solemn vows. The 1983 Code of Canon Law uses the expression "monastery of nuns". The new code did not force traditional orders that were taking on works outside the monastery into uniformity. In response to Vatican II there has been "vigorous discussion among monastics as regards what kinds of work and life-styles are genuinely compatible with monastic life".

See also
 Catholic sisters and nuns in the United States

References 

 This article incorporates text from a publication now in the public domain: Herbermann, Charles, ed. (1913). Catholic Encyclopedia. New York: Robert Appleton.